The Journal of Gambling Studies is a quarterly peer-reviewed medical journal covering all aspects of gambling. It was established in 1985 as the Journal of Gambling Behavior, obtaining its current name in 1990. It is published by Springer Science+Business Media and the editor-in-chief is Jon Grant (University of Chicago). According to the Journal Citation Reports, the journal has a 2017 impact factor of 2.090.

References

External links

Springer Science+Business Media academic journals
Quarterly journals
Publications established in 1985
English-language journals
Gambling publications
Psychiatry journals